The Echols County School District is a public school district in Echols County, Georgia, United States, based in Statenville. It serves the communities of Fruitland and Statenville.

Schools

The Echols County School District has one elementary-middle-high school, all in one building.

Elementary-middle-high school 
Echols County Elementary/Middle School
Echols County High School

Litigation
In 2020, the school district settled a racial discrimination case brought by a teacher who had been the only Black teacher in the district until she was fired in 2018 over alleged financial improprieties.

References

External links

School districts in Georgia (U.S. state)
Education in Echols County, Georgia